Bellefontaine or "belle fontaine" is the name of several places throughout the world.  The name is French for "beautiful fountain".

Populated places
In France
 Bellefontaine, Jura, in the department of Jura
 Bellefontaine, Manche, in the department of Manche
 Bellefontaine, Martinique, in the overseas department of Martinique
 Bellefontaine, Val-d'Oise, in the department of Val-d'Oise
 Bellefontaine, Vosges, in the department of Vosges

In the United States
 Belle Fontaine, Alabama, a census-designated place
 Bellefontaine, Mississippi, an unincorporated community
 Bellefontaine, Missouri, an unincorporated community
 Bellefontaine, Ohio, a city 

Elsewhere
 Belle Fontaine, Ouest, Haiti
 Bellefontaine, in Bièvre, Belgium
 Bellefontaine, Wallonia, in Tintigny, Belgium

Cemeteries
 Bellefontaine Cemetery, in St. Louis, Missouri

Forts
 Fort Belle Fontaine County Park, in St. Louis, Missouri
 Fort Bellefontaine, a historic site in Missouri, United States

Train stations
 Bellefontaine metro station in Toulouse

Other
Bellefontaine mansion in Lenox, Massachusetts designed by Carrere and Hastings

See also
 Bellfountain (disambiguation)

External links